The Sandale transmitting station is the main radio transmitting station for the county of Cumbria, including the Lake District, and eastern Dumfries and Galloway. It used to broadcast regional variations of BBC One and BBC Two until digital switchover happened in the region. All television channels now come from the nearby Caldbeck transmitting station.

The station is situated on the Caldbeck Fells close to the B5299 road and eight miles south of Wigton.

Until 1993 it broadcast Radio Solway. Now it broadcasts BBC Radio Scotland on the same frequency.

Services from this transmitter

Analogue radio (FM VHF)

Digital radio (DAB)

Analogue television

8 November 1956 – 27 September 1965

27 September 1965 – 1 June 1979

1 June 1979 – 3 January 1985

3 January 1985 - 1992

1992 - 22 July 2009

See also
 List of tallest buildings and structures in Great Britain

External links
 The Transmission Gallery: Photographs and Information
 The Transmission Gallery: FM Coverage Map
 Sandale Transmitter at thebigtower.com

Transmitter sites in England